Odin Valley is an ice free valley immediately east of Mount Odin in the Asgard Range, Victoria Land. Named by New Zealand Antarctic Place-Names Committee (NZ-APC) in association with Mount Odin.

Valleys of Victoria Land
McMurdo Dry Valleys